Dicoria canescens is a North American flowering plant in the family Asteraceae known by several common names including desert twinbugs and bugseed. This is a desert plant of the southwestern United States and northwestern Mexico, found in Sonora, Baja California, southern California, Nevada, Arizona, Utah, southwestern Colorado, and northwestern New Mexico.

Dicoria canescens forms thickets of many individuals in the desert sand. The distinctive lower leaves are long, pointed, sharply toothed, and covered in a coat of thin white or gray hairs. The upper leaves are smaller and more rounded. One plant can produce several whitish flower heads containing disc florets but no ray florets. Sometimes the heads form closely associated pairs, a characteristic which is the origin of the common name "twinbugs".

References

External links
Calflora Database: Dicoria canescens (Desert dicoria,  Desert twinbugs)
Jepson Manual eFlora (TJM2) treatment of Dicoria canescens
USDA Plants Profile for Dicoria canescens (desert twinbugs)
UC CalPhotos gallery

Heliantheae
Flora of the Southwestern United States
Flora of Baja California
Flora of the California desert regions
Flora of New Mexico
Flora of Sonora
Flora of the Sonoran Deserts
Natural history of the Colorado Desert
Natural history of the Mojave Desert
Plants described in 1859
Flora without expected TNC conservation status